Beč is a small settlement north of Begunje pri Cerknici in the Municipality of Cerknica in the Inner Carniola region of Slovenia.

Name
Beč was attested in written sources as Futsch in 1499. The name Beč is derived from the Slovene common noun beč '(stone- or wood-lined) hollow with a spring' (< *bъťъ), referring to a local geographical feature. The Slavic word *bъťъ was borrowed from Latin buttis 'barrel' and is also the origin of the Slovene toponyms Bač and Buč.

References

External links 

Beč on Geopedia

Populated places in the Municipality of Cerknica